Events from the year 2000 in Romania.

Incumbents 
 President: Emil Constantinescu, until 20 December; then Ion Iliescu
 Prime Minister: Mugur Isărescu until 28 October 2004; then Adrian Năstase

Events

January 

 10 January – President Emil Constantinescu the Law of retrocession of agricultural and forest lands, also known as the Lupu Law.
 30-31 January – 2000 Baia Mare cyanide spill: On the night of the 30th to the 31st of January, a dam of the Romanian-Australian "Aurul" venture is cracked on a portion of 25 metres, spilling 100,000 m3 of cyanide into the Lăpuș river, being subsequently spilled in the Someș, and then, the Tisza.

June 
 4 June – 2000 Romanian local elections:The first round of the local elections, with a tunrnout of 50.85%.
 18 June – 2000 Romanian local elections:The second round of the local elections, with a turnout of 46.93%.

July 
 17 July – Emil Constantinescu announces he won't run for a second presidential term in the 2000 Romanian general election.
 29 July – The Romanian Social Democratic Party absorbs the Socialist Party.

November 
 26 November – 2000 Romanian general election: The parliament is elected and the first presidential election round takes place. Ion Iliescu (PDSR) and Corneliu-Vadim Tudor (PRM) qualify for the second round.

December 
 10 December – 2000 Romanian general election: Ion Iliescu is elected president in the second round of the presidential election.

Births

January 
 5 January – Roxen, Romanian singer

February 
 2 February – Valentin Mihăilă, Romanian soccer player.

March 
 1 March – Ștefania Jipa, Romanian handball player.

September 
 16 September – Maria Holbură, retired Romanian gymnast.
 19 September – Denisa Vâlcan, Romanian handball player.

October 
 12 October – Mihai Popa, Romanian goalkeeper.

Deaths

February

 8 February – Ion Gheorghe Maurer, 97, Prime Minister of Romania.

June

 26 June – Corneliu Mănescu, 84, Romanian diplomat.

September

 17 September – Dem Rădulescu, 68, Romanian actor.

October

 5 October - Cătălin Hîldan, 24, Romanian football player.

See also

 Romania in the Eurovision Song Contest 2000
 Romania at the 2000 Summer Olympics
 Romania at the 2000 Summer Paralympics

References

External links 
 

2000s in Romania
2000 in Romania
Romania
Romania
Years of the 21st century in Romania